Jericó is a town and municipality in the Colombian Department of Boyacá, part of the Valderrama Province a subregion of Boyaca.

Notable residents
Olimpo López (1918–2015), pastry chef and creator of the Chocoramo (Productos Ramo)

References

Municipalities of Boyacá Department